Alex Wheatle is a 2020 historical drama film directed by Steve McQueen and co-written by McQueen and Alastair Siddons. It stars Sheyi Cole as Alex Wheatle, a Black British novelist who was sentenced to a term of imprisonment after the 1981 Brixton uprising. The film was released as part of the anthology series Small Axe on BBC One on 6 December 2020 and on Amazon Prime Video on 11 December 2020.

Cast 

 Sheyi Cole as Alex Wheatle
 Asad-Shareef Muhammad as Young Alex Wheatle
 Robbie Gee as Simeon
 Johann Myers as Cutlass Rankin
 Jonathan Jules as Dennis Isaacs
 Elliot Edusah	as Valin
 Khali Best as Badger
 Fumilayo Brown-Olateju as Dawn
 Dexter Flanders as Floyd

Reception
On review aggregator Rotten Tomatoes, the film holds an approval rating of 97% based on 43 critic reviews, with an average rating of 7.4/10. The website's critics consensus reads, "Sheyi Cole shines in Alex Wheatle, a harrowing biopic that barely scratches the surface of a complex life, but does so with empathy and finesse." Metacritic assigned the film a weighted average score of 77 out of 100, based on 17 critics, indicating "generally favorable reviews."

References

External links

2020 films
2020 television films
2020s historical drama films
2020 drama films
British historical drama films
2020s English-language films
2020s British films
Films directed by Steve McQueen